The Walking Dead is a 1995 war film written and directed by Preston A. Whitmore II and starring Allen Payne, Joe Morton and Eddie Griffin. The film depicts the lives of five Marines who are all assigned to rescue a group of POW during the Vietnam War in 1972. It opened to poor reviews and low box office receipts. Previews billed it as "the black experience in Vietnam".

The box-office gross was over $6,000,000.00.

Plot
In 1972 North Vietnam, short-timer Marines are dispatched by helicopter to conduct their last mission: to evacuate the survivors from a POW camp abandoned by the Viet Cong. The landing zone - which they expect to be cold - is actually hot (under fire) and after a short fight, only four members of the rescue mission survive. SSgt. Barkley and Hoover have a brief fight after Hoover wants to radio for an evacuation and Barkley insists they finish the mission. During their fight a mortar lands nearby, knocking them both into a swamp. Barkley saves Branche from drowning. They are joined shortly by Brooks and Evans. The soldiers defer to the ranking Marine, Sgt. Barkley, who insists that they press on to a nearby cathedral. They reach the building and kill several NVA soldiers. At morning, they are planning their next move when they are ambushed by more NVA soldiers including tree snipers. After a firefight they manage to kill the soldiers with the help of Cpl. Pippins, who appears from the brush and also begins attacking them. After subduing Pippins they look for the rest of his platoon and discover them murdered and their radio missing. They decide to tie Pippins up and bring him along as they march toward the POW camp.

The group then recollect about each of their individual reasons for joining the Marines. Sgt Barkley was a preacher at a church until he came home to his bedroom seeing his wife in bed having sex with another man, Barkley shoots and kills the man and catches the train out of town. Hoover works for a meat packing place until he got fired for stealing meat. Cole tries to rent an apartment, but he is turned down by the real estate agent, because of his race. Brooks tells his girlfriend that he's joining the Marine Corps to be like his grandfather, Pippins was working for Ray until he is killed by gangsters and chased into the military enlistment line without getting caught. While Cole and Barkley go ahead to survey the area, Hoover and Brooks smoke cannabis and talk about Brooks' girlfriend, who just dumped him via the mail. During their break, Pippins escapes and takes Brooks' pistol. The four men regroup and head out without Pippins. When they reach the camp, they discover a deranged Pippins holding a Vietnamese woman hostage. After killing the woman in front of them, Pippis turns on them with a gun and is killed by Sgt. Barkley. After seeing the camp is empty, the men realize they are expendable decoys. They radio in and are informed that the Marines cleared the POW camp four hours earlier, and that they have 20 minutes to reach their pickup point before the entire area is bombed. As the men go to leave bombs begin dropping on them. They escape the bombardment and head through the jungle to the landing zone, but are ambushed by more NVA soldiers. Brooks is killed, and Cole and Barkley wounded. Hoover goes back and rescues Barkley and the three men are evacuated by helicopter. During an epilogue, we are told that Cole became a career Marine who retired after 20 years of service, Sgt. Barkley took a job counseling troubled teens in Georgia, and Hoover went back home, married his girlfriend and opened up his own business.

Cast
Allen Payne as Cole Evans
Eddie Griffin as Pvt. Hoover Brache
Joe Morton as SSgt. Barkley 
Vonte Sweet as PFC. Joe Brooks
Roger Floyd as Cpl. Pippins
Bernie Mac as Ray
Ion Overman as Shirley Evans
Kyley Jackman as Sandra Evans
Jean-Claude La Marre as Pvt. Earl Anderson (as Jean LaMarre)
Lena Sang as Barbra Jean
Wendy Raquel Robinson as Celeste
Dana Point as Edna
Doil Williams as Harold
Damon Jones as 2nd Lt. Duffy
Kevin Jackson as Deuce

Soundtrack

The soundtrack album for the film was released on March 7, 1995, by Motown Records. It consists mostly of Motown hits from the 1960s and 1980s but also includes three newly recorded hip-hop songs exclusive to the soundtrack. The soundtrack failed to make it to the Billboard charts but Scarface's "Among the Walking Dead" was a minor hit on the R&B and rap charts.

Track listing
"How I Wish"- 4:49 (Queen Latifah)
"Smiling Faces Sometimes"- 3:13 (The Undisputed Truth)
"What's Going On"- 3:52 (Marvin Gaye)
"Ooo Baby Baby"- 2:43 (The Miracles)
"The Tracks of My Tears"- 3:01 (The Miracles)
"Cloud Nine"- 3:36 (The Temptations)
"Get Ready"- 2:47 (Rare Earth)
"I Heard It Through the Grapevine"- 5:53 (Marvin Gaye)
"War"- 3:26 (Edwin Starr)
"Among the Walking Dead"- 3:39 (Scarface)
"Conflict"- 4:33 (Whitehead Bros. ft. Queen Latifah and Big Rube)

References

External links
 
 
 The Walking Dead Plot Synopsis

1995 films
1990s war drama films
1990s English-language films
Vietnam War films
Films about the United States Marine Corps
Savoy Pictures films
American war drama films
Films scored by Gary Chang
1995 directorial debut films
1995 drama films
1990s American films